Pig fat is generally the fat in pork. The fatty acid composition of pork is found to be slightly different from meat of other animals, such as beef and lamb. The proportion of fat in pork can vary from 10–16%, but can be higher depending on the cut and level of trimming, among other factors.

Pork fat contains oleic acid with 60% monounsaturated fat, and is low in conjugated linoleic acid (CLA) and slightly richer in unsaturated fats. According to a 2018 BBC report, researchers who analysed more than 1,000 raw foods, ranked pork fat as the 8th-most nutritious food and gave it a nutritional score of 74. The researchers explained that pig fat was a good source of B vitamins and minerals, and contained more unsaturated fats than lamb or beef fat.

See also
Lard, visceral "soft fat", usually rendered and can be used as a cooking fat
Fatback, "hard fat", under the skin of the back, usually cured or fried
Salo, cured slabs of pig fat popular in Eastern Europe

References 

Animal fats
Pork